Flowerdew is a surname. Notable people with the surname include:

Alice Flowerdew (1759–1830), English teacher, hymnwriter, religious poet
Arthur Flowerdew (1906–2002), British engineer
Bob Flowerdew, British television presenter
Edward Flowerdew (c.1534–86), English politician and judge
Gordon Flowerdew, Canadian Cavalry officer in World War I and recipient of the Victoria Cross
Temperance Flowerdew (1590–1628), early settler of the Jamestown Colony of Virginia